This is a list of video games for the PlayStation 4 video game console that have sold or shipped at least one million copies.

List

Notes

References

External links

 

 
PlayStation 4
Best-selling PlayStation 4 video games